Tulyholove is a village in Lviv Raion (district) of Lviv Oblast (province) of western Ukraine. It belongs to Komarno urban hromada, one of the hromadas of Ukraine.  

Until 18 July 2020, Tulyholove belonged to Horodok Raion. The raion was abolished in July 2020, as part of the administrative reform of Ukraine, which reduced the number of raions of Lviv Oblast to seven. The area of Horodok Raion was merged into Lviv Raion.

Population 
Tulyholove's total population is 600.

People 
 Julian Fałat, Polish painter born in Tuligłowy

References

External links
 Information about village in the language Polish

Villages in Lviv Raion